Euryglottis is a genus of moths in the family Sphingidae. The genus was erected by Jean Baptiste Boisduval in 1875.

Species
Euryglottis albostigmata Rothschild 1895
Euryglottis aper (Walker 1856)
Euryglottis davidianus Dognin 1891
Euryglottis dognini Rothschild 1896
Euryglottis guttiventris (Rothschild & Jordan 1903)
Euryglottis johannes Eitschberger 1998
Euryglottis oliver Eitschberger 1998

Gallery

References

 
Sphingini
Moth genera
Taxa named by Jean Baptiste Boisduval